Pleasantville is an unincorporated community in Hickman County in the state of Tennessee, United States.

Populated places in Hickman County, Tennessee